The Kowŏn T'an'gwang Line, or Kowŏn Colliery Line, is an electrified secondary line of the Korean State Railway in Sudong District, South Hamgyŏng Province, North Korea, running from Tunjŏn on the P'yŏngra Line to Changdong.

Route 

A yellow background in the "Distance" box indicates that section of the line is not electrified.

References

Railway lines in North Korea
Standard gauge railways in North Korea